Tropical Storm Katrina was a short-lived, weak tropical cyclone that produced minor damage across areas previously devastated by Hurricane Mitch in 1998. Forming out of a broad area of low pressure in the southwestern Caribbean Sea on October 28, 1999, the disorganized tropical storm made landfall near Puerto Cabezas, Nicaragua with winds of 40 mph (65 km/h) on October 30 before weakening to a tropical depression. The remnants of the storm persisted until November 1, at which time it was absorbed by a cold front on the northern end of the Yucatán Peninsula.

Unlike Mitch, little damage resulted from Katrina and no fatalities were reported. Due to the lack of damage caused by the storm, the name was not retired and was re-used during 2005 at which time it was retired due to catastrophic damage in the United States.

Meteorological history

Tropical Storm Katrina originated out of the remnants of a cold front tracking southward through the Caribbean Sea on October 22. By October 26, a broad area of low pressure, associated with disorganized shower and thunderstorm activity, developed over the southwestern Caribbean Sea. The following day, a surface low pressure became apparent after the system showed signs of rotation near the northern Panama coastline. On October 28, a hurricane hunter flight into the circulation revealed a well-defined low pressure system and resulting in the system being declared Tropical Depression Fifteen while situated roughly 175 mi (280 km) east of Bluefields, Nicaragua. The center of the newly classified depression was situated on the western edge of deep convection. The depression tracked slowly towards the northeast in response to the mid-level flow it was embedded within.

By the morning of October 29, a tropical wave, tracking towards the west, began to interact with the depression and leading to forecasters discussing a possible merger of the two systems. An upper-level anticyclone over the eastern Caribbean produced significant wind shear over the depression, preventing the center from moving under the deep convection. However, a large convective banding feature developed to the north of the system. Several hours later, hurricane hunters flew through the storm and recorded surface winds of 40 mph (65 km/h) and a barometric pressure of 999 mbar (hPa; 29.5 inHg), leading to the upgrade of the depression to a tropical storm. At this time, the storm received the name Katrina and peaked in intensity. By 0000 UTC on October 30, the center of Katrina made landfall near Puerto Cabezas, Nicaragua at peak intensity. Within three hours, the storm weakened to a depression due to interaction with the mountains of Nicaragua and convection was limited to a small area on the western side of the center of circulation.

Katrina continued to track over Central America for most of October 30 and began to accelerate. Roughly 24 hours after landfall, the depression moved back over water, in the Gulf of Honduras; however, by this time, there was no convection remaining around the system. The acceleration of the storm was due to a regeneration of the low-level circulation northward. Due to unfavorable conditions, the weakened system failed to regenerate convection before moving back over land near the northern Belize-Mexico border. Around this time, forecasters reported that the depression would re-intensify once in the Gulf of Mexico before transitioning into an extratropical cyclone. Although situated over land, the depression began to regenerate convection, leading to increased rainfall over the Yucatan Peninsula. By the evening of November 1, the depression weakened again and moved into the Gulf of Mexico; however, unlike previous forecasts, the circulation was absorbed by a cold front hours later.

Preparations and Impact

Despite being a very weak storm, forecasters were wary about Katrina, as Central America was devastated by Hurricane Mitch exactly one year earlier. There was considerable fear of additional flash flooding and mudslides across the mountainous region. Immediately after being declared a tropical depression, a tropical storm warning was issued for Nicaragua, and it was extended to the San Andrés islands of Colombia shortly afterward. Officials in Honduras evacuated 71 families from the district of Colón and another 17 families from other at-risk areas. Along the coastline of Honduras, a red alert was declared as torrential rains were anticipated to produce deadly mudslides in areas still recovering from Mitch nearly one year ago.

Overall, damage was minimal as a result of Katrina. Only a few small mudslides were reported, along with some minor flooding, as the storm tracked across Central America. It was estimated that between 10 and 15 inches (250 to 375 mm) of rain fell across parts of the region as a result of Katrina, with one report of 3.58 inches (91 mm) in six hours from the island of San Andrés east of Nicaragua. Roughly 1,200 people were evacuated to emergency shelters in Honduras due to flooding. At least five bridges sustained damage and the cities of Tocoa and Trujillo were isolated as the Aguán and Siline rivers overflowed their banks. The water pipes recently constructed after being destroyed by Hurricane Mitch, worth HNL 170,000 (US$9,000) were once again destroyed by Katrina. The most severely affected area in Honduras was the Valle del Aguán.

Moisture from the remnants of the storm enhanced rainfall across southern Florida in association with the cold front that absorbed the system. Already saturated by previous rains, the National Weather Service issued flood watches for the region as torrential rains were expected to fall in relation to the system.

Following the storm, the United Nations deployed field assessment teams to survey the damage caused by Katrina. The International Organization for Migration helped relocate affected families and construct at least 300 new residences for victims of Katrina and Hurricane Mitch the year prior. The Pan American Health Organization also deployed assessment teams to survey the area for the possibility of post-storm diseases. Due to the lack of any significant damage, the name Katrina was not retired and was re-used in the 2005 season; however, due to the catastrophic damage caused by the storm, it was retired in 2006 and was replaced with the name Katia.

See also

1999 Atlantic hurricane season
Tropical Storm Matthew (2010)
Hurricane Nate

References

External links

 NHC's Preliminary Report on Tropical Storm Katrina

1999 Atlantic hurricane season
Hurricanes in Nicaragua
Hurricanes in Honduras
Atlantic tropical storms
Hurricanes in Belize
1999 in Belize
1999 in Honduras
1999 in Nicaragua